Luke Jennings (born 1953) is a British author, dance critic and journalist.

Jennings trained as a dancer at the Rambert School, was one of the students of the Expressionist and Integrated dance pedagoge Hilde Holger, studied Indian languages, and produced and directed a Channel 4 documentary filmed in Bombay.

As a journalist, Jennings has written for Vanity Fair and The New Yorker, and has reported from locations around the world, including Moscow. He was dance critic for The Observer and also wrote dance-related articles for Time.

Published works
Jennings' first novel, Breach Candy (1993), follows a recently retired ballerina and an intelligent-but-wounded television director researching a Channel 4 documentary in Mumbai.

Jennings' novel, Atlantic (1995), which takes place in a cruise ship in the post-war years, was nominated for the Booker Prize.

Beauty Story (1998) is a novel about a young actress who vanishes from a 16th-century English castle where she was filming a fragrance commercial.

The acknowledgements section in At Risk (2004) by Stella Rimington indicates that it was written with the help of Luke Jennings: "Huge thanks are also due to Luke Jennings whose help with the research and the writing made it all happen."

Blood Knots: Of Fathers, Friendship and Fishing—a 2010 memoir about fishing, and about "childhood innocence, paternal love, and his friendship with the charismatic, enigmatic" man who was later killed by the IRA while working as an intelligence officer in Ireland—was shortlisted for the 2010 BBC Samuel Johnson Prize and for the William Hill prize.

With his daughter, Jennings co-wrote the Stars youth fiction series (circa 2013), about teenagers at a performing arts school.

Jennings co-authored The Faber Pocket Guide to Ballet (2014).

Jennings' 2017 book Codename Villanelle, a compilation of four serial Kindle edition novellas published between 2014 and 2016, was the basis for BBC America's Killing Eve television series. Though his 2018 sequel Killing Eve: No Tomorrow diverged from the television show, the books and show are said to "share common DNA" because of Jennings' continued collaboration with the show's creators. A third volume of the Villanelle series, Killing Eve: Die For Me, was released on 19 March 2020.

‘’Lifelines-An Anthology of Angling Anecdotes, and More…‘’ NAROD Publishing, 2021. A collection of 27 short stories concerning angling by 27 different authors, including “Homecoming” by Luke Jennings.

See also
 Eve Polastri
 Villanelle (character)

References

External links
 
 

English male novelists
20th-century English novelists
21st-century English novelists
English spy fiction writers
English thriller writers
1953 births
Living people
Killing Eve